The Bréguet 730 was a French flying boat of the 1930s. Built to meet the requirements of the French Navy, it was ordered into production but no aircraft were delivered before France surrendered to Germany in June 1940. Four remaining incomplete airframes were completed after the end of World War II, serving with the French Navy until 1954.

Development

The French Navy issued a specification for a new long-range flying boat to replace the obsolete 521 Bizerte in May 1935. Bréguet designed a large four engined flying boat to meet the requirement, the Breguet 730, competing against designs by Latécoère (the Latécoère 611), Lioré et Olivier (the LeO H-440) and Potez-CAMS (the Potez-CAMS 141).

The first prototype, the Br.730-01, powered by  Gnome-Rhône 14N-2 and Gnome-Rhône 14N-3 engines, flew on 4 April 1938 at Le Havre. The N-2 engines were fitted at No.1 and No.3 positions and the N-3s at No.2 and No.4 positions, rotating in opposite directions. It was wrecked, however, on 16 July 1938 when it attempted to land in shallow water. Despite this setback, however, an order for four production aircraft was placed, followed by a contract for unlimited production on the outbreak of World War II in September 1939. This order was cut in early 1940 when it realised that attrition of maritime patrol aircraft was very low.

Operational history
No production aircraft had been completed when France surrendered on 22 June 1940, when production was suspended. It was restarted by the Vichy government, with the wing of the wrecked prototype being combined with the hull of the first production machine to produce the Br. 730 No.1, which was ready to fly when the German invasion of Vichy France prevented testing. Production of the remaining 11 aircraft continued extremely slowly under German occupation, with eight being destroyed in an Allied air raid on 6 April 1944.

The Br.730 No.1 was finally flown for the first time in December 1944, after the Germans retreated from the South of France. This aircraft, named Véga, was delivered to the French Navy, who used it as a long-range transport in April 1945, with a second Br.730 (Sirius) completed in May 1946. The remaining two aircraft (Altair and Bellatrix) were completed with redesigned nose, new floats and more powerful engines, and were designated Br.731.

Véga was destroyed in a crash in January 1949, with a second aircraft being destroyed in 1951. The last Br.731 was retired on 20 January 1954.

Variants
Br.730-01
Prototype. Powered by four 753 kW (1,010 hp) Gnome-Rhône 14N 2/3 engines.
Br.730
Production version. Powered by four 835 kW (1,120 hp) Gnome-Rhône 14N 44/45 engines. Two built.
Br.731
Modified nose and floats. Powered by 1,010 kW (1,350 hp) Gnome-Rhône 14R 200/201 engines. Two built.

Operators

French Navy

Specifications (Br.730)

See also

References

Bibliography

External links

Breguet Br 730
Breguet Br 731

 0730
1930s French military reconnaissance aircraft
Flying boats
Four-engined tractor aircraft
High-wing aircraft
Aircraft first flown in 1938
Four-engined piston aircraft